Kävik the Wolf Dog is a novel written in 1968 by Walt Morey. It won the 1968 Dutton Animal Book Award as a draft, resulting in its subsequent publication.

Made-for-TV movie
A made-for-TV movie called The Courage of Kavik the Wolf Dog based on the book aired under the Sunday Big Event umbrella on NBC in 1979.

Plot
Kävik, an Alaskan malamute sled dog, gets sold from Charlie One-eye to Mr. Hunter for $2,000 after winning the North American Sled-dog race and is loaded on a plane in an iron-barred cage. In the middle of the trip, something goes wrong and the plane crashes into the ground, killing pilot Smiley Johnson before he even has time to undo his seatbelt.

Kävik's cage makes a gaping hole in the side of the plane as it crashes in the eye of a storm. After being trapped in a cage for three days while starving, freezing, and getting multiple wounds from neighboring animals, Kävik is found by young Andy Evans, a teenage boy whose trapline was the location of the wreck.

Andy uses his belt axe to open the cage and uses a piece of the plane's wing to create a sled to carry the injured dog until they reach a cave, where Andy and Kävik spend the night. The next morning, Andy is shaken awake by his father, Kurt Evans, and they take Kävik back to their house. Laura Evans, Andy's mother, suggests that they take him over to Dr. Walker.

When Dr. Walker arrives, he is led to believe by Andy that Laura was sick, but he learns that Kävik was injured instead and refuses to operate on him because he is a people doctor, not a veterinarian. But with Laura's tricky ways, he is persuaded to help Kavik to the best of his abilities.

Over the period of a few weeks, Kävik almost fully recovers and heals. Andy notices he is as good as new when he climbs up the stairs and is able to open his door. One day, while Andy is at his job downtown, Kävik escapes to town and gets chased by a pack of dogs led by Blackie. It turns out he has lost his fighting courage due to the horrible plane wreck.

A few weeks later, Andy comes home and notices that Kävik is nowhere to be found. His dad tells Andy that Mr. Hunter came by earlier that day and took Kävik back with him to his home in Washington, despite being told by Andy's father that Kävik is a complete coward and that he had lost his wolflike courage.

When Mr. Hunter goes to show Kävik off, Kävik escapes out of a window and sets out over 2,000 miles to return to Andy, the only person who ever loved him enough to take care of him. While he was traveling he found a mate who later got killed. The return journey comprises most of the second half of the novel.

See also

Walt Morey
Gentle Ben

References

1968 American novels
American children's novels
Children's novels about animals
Fictional dogs
American novels adapted into films
1968 children's books